El Clásico Sampedrano (The Sampedran Derby) is a Honduran football match played at least 4 times a year in the Honduran Liga Nacional and consists of two teams, Marathón and Real España.  These two teams are from San Pedro Sula, hence the name.

Head to head

All time scorers
 As of 31 October 2020
 Carlos Pavón for Real España with 10 goals.
 Gilberto Machado for Marathón with 8 goals

Finals
Since the creations of Finals, there have been three Sampedran derbies, two won by Real España, and one by Marathón.

Trivia
 This is the Honduran derby that has been played in the most cities.
 Real España dominates the derby by far, but the resurgence since 2000 by Marathón has brought a new mentality for their supporters.

References

External links 
 C.D. Marathón
 Real España

Association football rivalries in Honduras
Real C.D. España
C.D. Marathón